Felicity Jane Montagu (born 12 September 1960) is an English actress. She is best known for playing  Lynn Benfield, the long-suffering assistant of Alan Partridge.

Early life
Montagu was born in Leeds, West Riding of Yorkshire, to Lieutenant-Colonel John Drogo Montagu (1916–2013), whose great-great-grandfather, Admiral George Montagu, was the great-great-grandson of the Hon. James Montagu (d. 1665), who, in turn, was the third son of Henry Montagu, 1st Earl of Manchester. She attended Loughborough University and the Webber Douglas Academy of Dramatic Art.

Career

Film
Montagu's reputation in comedy character parts was enhanced by her performance in Bridget Jones's Diary as Perpetua, Bridget's unpleasant colleague. She also appeared in the 2006 film Confetti as highly strung magazine editor Vivien Kay-Wylie. She appeared in the film I Want Candy in which she plays the mother of an ambitious teenager. She appeared in How to Lose Friends & Alienate People (2008). In 2013, she reprised her role as Lynn Benfield for the Alan Partridge film Alan Partridge: Alpha Papa, and Mrs Mainwaring in the 2016 Dad's Army film. In 2016, Montagu reprised her role as Miss Adolf from the Hank Zipzer series in the TV movie Hank Zipzer's Christmas Catastrophe.

Television

In 2004 and 2005, Montagu starred in the ITV comedy drama Doc Martin as Caroline Bosman, the radio presenter of Radio Portwenn. She played Lynn, the faithful but put-upon personal assistant in I'm Alan Partridge, and the vicar's wife Sue in Nighty Night. In 2006, she took the leading role of housewife and gang queen Barbara Du Prez in the comedy series Suburban Shootout. Her other television credits include Mapp and Lucia, The Bill, Lovejoy, Health and Efficiency, Wish Me Luck, Tumbledown, Harry Enfield's Television Programme, 2point4 Children, A Touch of Frost, My Life as a Popat, Johnny and the Bomb, Peak Practice, The Queen's Sister, Coogan's Run, Doc Martin, Lead Balloon, Alexei Sayle's Stuff, Skins, Hank Zipzer, M.I. High, The Durrells, The End of the F***ing World, Rab C. Nesbitt, and Sally4Ever.
In 2020, she appeared as a contestant on Celebrity Masterchef.

Theatre
After graduating from drama school, Montagu was cast in the Terry Johnson play Unsuitable for Adults at the Bush Theatre. She went on to work at the Royal Court Theatre and the Royal National Theatre. After a long hiatus due to her screen work, Montagu returned to the stage when she starred as Melanie alongside Rowan Atkinson in the 2013 West End production of Quartermaine's Terms at Wyndham's Theatre. In 2017, she appeared at the Liverpool Playhouse in a stage adaptation of Jane Austen's Pride and Prejudice as Mrs Bennet, alongside Matthew Kelly as Mr Bennet.

Radio
Montagu has also been a regular voice on a range of comedy programmes on BBC Radio 4 since the mid-1980s.  Her credits include Dirk Gently's Holistic Detective Agency, Delve Special, Ayres on the Air, Dial M For Pizza, Old Harry's Game, The Million Pound Radio Show, Revolting People, and No Commitments.

Personal life
Montagu married Alan Nixon in 1984. They divorced in 2006. The couple have two children, Olivia (born 1990) and Luke (born 10 Aug 1996). Felicity and Olivia worked together in 2016 in the BBC Radio 4 series Guilt Trip, where they played a fictional mother and daughter.

Filmography

References

External links

1960 births
Living people
Actresses from Leeds
English film actresses
Alumni of Loughborough University
English radio actresses
English television actresses
Felicity